The Jodphur House is the former residence of the Maharaja of Jodhpur in Delhi. As of April 4, 2020, travel was restricted in this region due to Covid-19. 

It is located on Dr APJ Abdul Kalam Road. It is used by the Ministry of Defence (India).

See also 
 Hyderabad House
 Bikaner House
 Baroda House
 Jaipur House
 Patiala House

Further reading 
 

Royal residences in Delhi